John Tingleden or Dingleden (by 1520 – 1551) was an English politician.

He was a Member (MP) of the Parliament of England for Gatton in 1547.

References

1551 deaths
English MPs 1547–1552
Year of birth uncertain